Tony Peake (born 1951) is a novelist, short story writer and biographer. He was born in South Africa, but has been based in Britain since the early 1970s.

Biography

Early life
Tony Peake was born in Johannesburg, South Africa, in 1951 to English parents. His father, Bladon Peake (1902–1972), was a theatre and film director. Peake was educated at Waterkloof House Preparatory School in Pretoria, St. Martin's School in Johannesburg and at Rhodes University in Grahamstown, where he read History and English, graduating with a BA (Hons) degree in English.

Career
Peake moved to London in 1973. He worked as production manager at the Open Space Theatre under Charles Marowitz and Thelma Holt. In the late 1970s he lived for a while on Ibiza and taught English, History and Drama at the Morna Valley School. Since then he has lived in London and Mistley and worked in modelling, acting, film distribution and as a literary agent.

As a short story writer and essayist, Peake has contributed to four volumes of Winter’s Tales (edited by Robin Baird-Smith, Constable); The Penguin Book of Contemporary South African Short Stories (edited by Stephen Gray); The Mammoth Book of Gay Short Stories (edited by Peter Burton, Robinson Publishing); New Writing 13 (edited by Toby Litt and Ali Smith, Picador); The Way We Are Now: gay and lesbian lives in the 21st century (a Stonewall (UK) anthology edited by Ben Summerskill, Continuum); Seduction (Serpent's Tail), a themed anthology which he also edited; Yes, I Am! Writing by South African Gay Men (compiled by Robin Malan and Ashraf Johaardien, Junkets Publisher, Cape Town); Speak My Language, and Other Stories (edited by Torsten Højer, Robinson Publishing) and Best British Short Stories 2016 (edited by Nicholas Royle, Salt Publishing).

Peake is also the author of three novels, A Summer Tide (Abacus, 1993), Son to the Father (Little, Brown, 1995; Abacus, 1996) and North Facing (Myriad Editions, 2017), and the authorised biography of Derek Jarman (Little, Brown, 1999; Abacus, 2000; Overlook Press, 2000; reissued in the States by the University of Minnesota Press, 2011).

Works

Books
A Summer Tide (Abacus, 1993),  (trade paperback),  (paperback)
Son to the Father (Little, Brown, 1995; Abacus 1996),  (hardback),  (paperback)
North Facing (Myriad Editions, 2017),  (paperback),  (ebook)
Derek Jarman (Little, Brown, 1999; Abacus, 2000; Overlook Press, 2000; reissued in the States by the University of Minnesota Press, 2011),  (paperback),  (ebook)

Short stories
 "Necessary Appendages", in Winter's Tales 7, edited by Robin Baird-Smith, Constable, London, 1991, 
 "Girl Dancing", in Winter's Tales 8, edited by Robin Baird-Smith, Constable, London, 1992, 
 "Necessary Appendages", in The Penguin Book of Contemporary South African Short Stories, edited by Steven Gray, Penguin, London, 1993, 
 "A Son's Story", in Winter's Tales 9, edited by Robin Baird-Smith, Constable, London, 1993, 
 "The Good Butler", in Seduction, edited by Tony Peake, Serpent's Tail, London, 1994, 
 "Crossing the Line", in Winter's Tales 10, edited by Robin Baird-Smith, Constable, London, 1994, 
 "A Son's Story", in The Mammoth Book of Gay Short Stories, edited by Peter Burton, Robinson Publishing, London, 1997, 
 "By the Pool", in The Gay Times Book of Short Stories: New Century New Writing, edited by P-P Hartnett, Gay Times Books, Millivres Ltd., London, 2000, 
 "A Portrait", in New Writing 13, edited by Toby Litt & Ali Smith, Picador, London, 2005, 
 "Fairy Tale", An essay in The Way We Are Now: gay and lesbian lives in the 21st century, edited by Ben Summerskill, Continuum, London, 2006, 
 "History Lesson", Untitled Books, September 2008 www.untitledbooks.com
 "Lucky for Some", Sunday Express, 17 January 2010 www.express.co.uk
 "History Lesson", in Yes, I Am! Writing by South African Gay Men, compiled by Robin Malan & Ashraf Johaardien, Cape Town: Junkets Publisher, 2010, 
 "Raw Material", in The New Writer, May/June 2010 
 "The Good Butler", in Speak My Language, and Other Stories, edited by Torsten Højer, Robinson Publishing, London, 2015,  (paperback)   (ebook)
 "The Bluebell Wood", in Anglo Files No. 177, September 2015 www.www.engelskforeningen.dk/anglo-files/
 "The Bluebell Wood", in Best British Short Stories 2016, edited by Nicholas Royle, Salt Publishing, 2016,  (paperback)   (ebook)

References

External links
 www.tonypeake.com

Living people
South African male novelists
South African biographers
Male biographers
South African male writers
South African LGBT novelists
1951 births
People from Johannesburg
Rhodes University alumni
20th-century South African novelists
21st-century South African novelists